Dhani may refer to

Places
Dhani (settlement type), a type of small settlement in India
Dhani Bandhwali, small village situated near the town of Nangal Choudhary, India
Dhani Dulat, village of district Fatehabad, Haryana, India
Dhani Kumharan, small village in the Buhana tehsil of Jhunjhunu district of Rajasthan, India
Dhani Poonia, village in Taranagar tehsil of Churu district in Rajasthan, India
Dhani-Sela, village located in the Bali tehsil in the Pali district of Rajasthan, India
 Dhani Waterfall, high waterfall in Neelum Valley, Azad Kashmir, Pakistan
Ghaslo Ki Dhani, village of Kishangarh tahsil, Ajmer district, Rajasthan, India
Meharon Ki Dhani, small village in Jaisalmer district, Rajasthan, India
Salamsingh Ki Dhani, small village in the outskirts of the Sikar city, Rajasthan, India

People

Given name 
Dhani Ram Chatrik (1876–1954), pioneer of modern Punjabi poetry
Dhani Ram Shandil (born 1940), Indian colonel and politician
Dhani Harrison (born 1978), English musician
Dhani Jones (born 1978), American football player and television host
Dhani Lennevald (born 1984), Swedish Pop/R&B singer and former member of the pop band the A*Teens

Middle name 
Kallu Dhani Ram (born 1923), head of the oldest farmers union in Fiji

Family name 
Ahmad Dhani (born 1972), Indonesian rock musician, songwriter, arranger, and producer
Omar Dhani, Indonesian air marshal

Honorific title 
Dhani, one of the components of the honorific title of the Aga Khan

Others
 Dhani (raga), an Indian classical raga
 Dhani dialect, an Indo-Aryan dialect cluster of Pakistan
 Dhani Tackles the Globe, American documentary television series hosted by NFL linebacker Dhani Jones
 Dhani (company), an Indian online brokerage company
 Kismat Ka Dhani, 1946 Bollywood film

See also 
 Dhanni (disambiguation)
 Dhaani, a 2003 album by Pakistani pop band Strings
 Dhany (born 1972), Italian singer